The Murray Baker Bridge is a landmark cantilever bridge that carries Interstate 74 (I-74) and Illinois Route 29 (IL 29) over the Illinois River from downtown Peoria to East Peoria in central Illinois.

The bridge itself is a single cantilever bridge, with two lanes in each direction. Because it has no shoulders, the Baker Bridge is not up to modern Interstate standards.

The bridge is named for Murray M. Baker, who was the first vice president of the company that eventually became Caterpillar. Baker convinced the Holt Manufacturing Company to move to Peoria in 1909. Holt merged with C.L. Best Gas Tractor Co. and became Caterpillar in 1925.

History

2005 Reconstruction
On January 3, 2006, the Illinois Department of Transportation and the chief design consultant for the truss shortening, Alfred Benesch & Company, were awarded the 2006 Eminent Conceptor Award by the American Council of Engineering Companies of Illinois (ACEC-IL). The project was picked out of a larger group of Honor Award recipients.

2020 Reconstruction
The bridge was closed for construction on March 29, 2020. By removing traffic from the work zone, the repairs were completed in just one construction season, reducing the overall project cost and eliminating a safety risk to workers and motorists.

Following extensive renovations, the Murray Baker Bridge rehabilitation was completed on schedule and reopened to the public on October 31, 2020. The project, one of the first under Governor Pritzker's historic, bipartisan Rebuild Illinois capital program, improved the critical travel corridor by closing the work zone to all traffic for seven months instead of multiple construction seasons.

The $42.2 million rehabilitation project removed and replaced the existing bridge deck, repaired structural steel, repainted lower portions of the bridge and installed new lighting, resulting in a smoother, safer ride for commuter and freight traffic. As part of a joint effort with the City of Peoria, energy-efficient decorative lighting was added to enhance a community focal point. The Murray Baker Bridge carries almost 68,000 vehicles a day.

Photographs

References 

Bridges completed in 1958
Buildings and structures in Peoria, Illinois
Interstate 74
Bridges over the Illinois River
East Peoria, Illinois
Bridges in Tazewell County, Illinois
Bridges on the Interstate Highway System
Cantilever bridges in the United States
Road bridges in Illinois
Bridges in Peoria County, Illinois